The Spanish Footballers' Association (AFE) is the association for professional footballers in Spain. Currently its president is David Aganzo.

External links
Official website

1978 establishments in Spain
Association football trade unions
Spanish football organisations
Trade unions in Spain

Trade unions established in 1978